Batino is a rural industrial barangay located at Calamba, Laguna, Philippines. Batino is located to the east of Barandal, south of Mayapa, north of Prinza and west of Paciano Rizal. Most of the establishments, if not all, are located on the west side of South Luzon Expressway (SLEX), leaving the east side of the barangay less developed than the west side of it, partly because the only access points are the SLEX and the Batino-Mayapa Road.

Etymology
Barangay Batino got its name from the hard milkwood tree or Alstonia microphylla, which is called batino in Tagalog. The tree was once abundant in the area.

Calamba Premiere International Park

In this barangay, numerous companies like Avon, Samsung, Shin Heung Electro Digital Inc., Lux Manufacturing, and Nestle have set up their warehouses and factories. It is one of the first industrial complexes to be established in the Philippines and plays an important economic role at the City of Calamba and the whole of Calabarzon.

Population

References

External links
Official Website of the Government of Laguna

Barangays of Calamba, Laguna